Lusius Quietus was a Roman Berber general and 11th legate of Judaea from 117. He was the principal commander against the Jewish rebellion known as the Kitos War (Kitos is a later corruption of Quietus). As both a general and a highly acclaimed commander, he was notably one of the most accomplished Berber statesmen in ancient Roman history. After the death of the emperor Trajan, Quietus was murdered or executed, possibly on the orders of Trajan's successor Hadrian.

Life
Originally a Berber prince, Lusius' father and his warriors had supported the Roman legions in their attempt to subdue Mauretania Tingitana (northern modern-day Morocco) during Aedemon's revolt in 40.

Citizen and commander
His father's service to Rome, on a notoriously difficult frontier, was honoured with the gift of Roman citizenship for him and his family. His son Lusius later joined the Roman army and served as an auxiliary officer in the Roman cavalry. For outstanding service, emperor Domitian rewarded him with equestrian rank but later had him dismissed from service for insubordination.

Quietus's fortunes were revived once again when a new emperor, Trajan, came to power. Quietus was brought back into the army and served as one of the emperor's auxiliary cavalry commanders during the Dacian Wars (his bareheaded Berber cavalry can be seen on Trajan's column in Rome). After the successful conquest of Dacia, Quietus was elevated to the position of senator. He next served with the emperor during his campaign in Parthia during which he led a brilliant rearguard action, which allowed the tactical withdrawal of troops and saved them from destruction. This action brought Quietus acclaim and ensured he was well known to the army.

During the emperor's Parthian campaign in 115–116, Quietus sacked the cities of Nisibis and Edessa. When the inhabitants of Babylonia revolted, they were suppressed by Quietus, who was rewarded by being appointed governor of Judaea. 

Major revolts by diasporic Jews in Cyrene (Cyrenaica), Cyprus, Mesopotamia, and Egypt resulted in the ransacking of towns and the slaughter of Roman citizens and others by the Jewish rebels, a conflict now known as the Kitos War, after a simplified version of Quietus's name. Quietus took the city of Lydda and methodically set about defeating the rebellions.

Death
The emperor Trajan died later in the year and was succeeded by Hadrian and the rebellion in Judaea was finally crushed by Quietus. Quietus was murdered later in the year (118) and it has been theorized that Quietus was assassinated on the orders of the new emperor, Hadrian, for fear of Quietus' popular standing with the army and his close connections to Trajan. A Talmudic story also relates that the Roman general who defeated the rebellious Jews at this time was suddenly executed.

Bibliography
 Bartolomeo Borghesi, Œuvres, i. 500;
 Heinrich Graetz, Geschichte. 3d ed., iv. 116 et seq., 407 et seq.;
 Emil Schürer, Geschichte 3d ed., i. 617, 666–670;
 Prosopographia Imperii Romani, ii. 308, No. 325;
 Adolf von Schlatter, Die Tage Trajans und Hadrians, p. 90, (Gütersloh, 1897.)
 Michael Brett and Elisabeth Fentress. The Berbers pp. 54–55. Blackwell, 1996.

See also
 Roman Prefects and Procurators of Judaea Province, AD 6-132 AD

References
 

Roman governors of Judaea
Ancient Roman generals
1st-century Berber people
2nd-century Berber people
1st-century Romans
2nd-century Romans
2nd-century Roman governors of Judaea
Year of birth unknown
118 deaths
Romans from Africa
Executed ancient Roman people
People executed by the Roman Empire
Lusii
Jewish–Roman wars
Generals of Trajan